Yaqoub Al-Balochi (Arabic:يعقوب البلوشي) (born 10 July 1990) is an Emirati footballer. He currently plays as a defender for Al Nasr .

References

External links
 

Emirati footballers
1990 births
Living people
Al-Ittihad Kalba SC players
Al-Shaab CSC players
Al-Nasr SC (Dubai) players
Association football defenders
Emirati people of Baloch descent
UAE First Division League players
UAE Pro League players